Edvard Nielsen-Stevns (21 May 1880 – 25 February 1949) was a Danish writer. His work was part of the literature event in the art competition at the 1928 Summer Olympics.

References

1880 births
1949 deaths
20th-century Danish male writers
Olympic competitors in art competitions